Antonio Bacci (17th century) was an Italian painter of the Baroque period, active in Rovigo as a still life painter. He was born c. 1600 and still alive in Venice in 1665.

References

Italian still life painters
17th-century Italian painters
Italian male painters
Painters from Venice
Italian Baroque painters
Year of birth missing
Year of death missing